Adrian Valentić (born 10 August 1987) is a Croatian footballer who plays as a defender.

Career
He left Inter Zaprešić in February 2012.

References

External links
HNL Statistika profile

Profile at the Croatian Football Federation

1987 births
Living people
Footballers from Zagreb
Association football defenders
Croatian footballers
Croatia youth international footballers
1. FSV Mainz 05 II players
NK Varaždin players
NK Lokomotiva Zagreb players
NK Međimurje players
NK Inter Zaprešić players
Karlsruher SC II players
NK Rudeš players
SHB Da Nang FC players
Can Tho FC players
Regionalliga players
Croatian Football League players
First Football League (Croatia) players
Second Football League (Croatia) players
Oberliga (football) players
V.League 1 players
Croatian expatriate footballers
Expatriate footballers in Germany
Croatian expatriate sportspeople in Germany
Expatriate footballers in Vietnam
Croatian expatriate sportspeople in Vietnam